John Barkley Dawson (November 10, 1830 – December 27, 1918) was a US Rancher and namesake of the town of Dawson, New Mexico, which is located on land that he bought in 1869 and sold in 1901.

External links

 

1830 births
1918 deaths
People from Colfax County, New Mexico
Ranchers from New Mexico